Titas Buzas (born 14 June 2004) is a Lithuanian professional footballer who plays as an attacking midfielder for the Under-19 squad of German club FC Augsburg.

He played for DFK Dainava in First League until 2021. In the summer of 2021, he left Alytus and moved to Ukraine to play for the youth team of Dynamo Kyiv.

In 2022, he returned to Lithuania to play for FK Jonava. In June, he left Jonava.

References

External links
 
 

2004 births
Living people
Sportspeople from Marijampolė
Lithuanian footballers
Lithuania youth international footballers
Association football midfielders
FK Dainava Alytus players
FC Dynamo Kyiv players
FK Jonava players
FC Augsburg players
A Lyga players
Lithuanian expatriate footballers
Expatriate footballers in Portugal
Lithuanian expatriate sportspeople in Portugal
Expatriate footballers in Ukraine
Lithuanian expatriate sportspeople in Ukraine
Expatriate footballers in Germany
Lithuanian expatriate sportspeople in Germany